is a Japanese TV presenter and news anchor. She has headed Fuji Television's Super News evening news programme alongside Tetsuo Suda since April 2000.

Career
As a newscaster, Ando has presented the following Fuji TV evening news programmes since 1987.
 FNN Super Time (October 1987 – March 1994)
 News Japan (April 1994 – March 2000)
 Super News (April 2000 – )

During her career, she has interviewed many heads of state, including Philippine President Corazon Aquino, US President Bill Clinton, Philippine President Ferdinand Marcos, British Prime Minister Margaret Thatcher, and Polish President Lech Walesa.

Personal life
Ando first married in December 1989, to an advertising agency employee, but divorced in March 1993.

See also 
 Tarō Kimura (journalist), Super News commentator

References

External links 
 Fuji Television newscaster profile 

1958 births
Living people
Fuji News Network personalities
Japanese television personalities
People from Ichikawa, Chiba